Juan Daniel Cardellino de San Vicente  (March 4, 1942 – September 8, 2007) was a football (soccer) referee from Uruguay, who officiated at two FIFA World Cups: 1982 (two matches) and 1990 (one match).

References
 Profile

1942 births
Uruguayan football referees
FIFA World Cup referees
1990 FIFA World Cup referees
Copa América referees
Olympic football referees
Place of birth missing
2007 deaths
1982 FIFA World Cup referees